Thibault Daubagna (born 20 May 1994) is a French rugby union player. His position is scrum-half and he currently plays for Pau in the Top 14.

References

External links
Pau profile
L'Équipe profile

1994 births
Living people
French rugby union players
Section Paloise players
Rugby union scrum-halves
Sportspeople from Pau, Pyrénées-Atlantiques